Shareef Budmaash is a 1973 Bollywood action thriller film directed by Raj Khosla. The film stars Dev Anand, Hema Malini, Ajit, Jeevan in pivotal roles.

Cast 
Dev Anand as Inspector Ramesh / Rocky
Hema Malini as Seema
Ajit as Ranjeet
Jeevan as Diwan 
Helen as Carmen / Rita
Shatrughan Sinha as Rocky / Kanhaiyalal
Trilok Kapoor as DIG
Jankidas as Prisoner
D. K. Sapru as Lawyer
Sudhir as Ajit
Mac Mohan as Ranjeet's Henchman
Bhagwan as Ranjeet's Henchman
Gurbachan Singh as Ranjeet's Henchman

Soundtrack 
The songs were composed by R. D. Burman and written by Anand Bakshi.

References

External links 
 

1973 films
1970s Hindi-language films
Films scored by R. D. Burman
1970s action thriller films
Films directed by Raj Khosla